Fairy Tale Killer (追凶, Pupil in Chinese) is a 2012 Hong Kong horror film directed by Danny Pang Phat. The film was released on 11 May 2012 and stars Sean Lau, Wang Baoqiang, and Elanne Kong. The Fairy Tale Killer follows police detective Wong Wai-han as he investigates a series of brutal murders.

Plot
When a bloodied and incoherent Wu Zaijun confesses to five murders that have not occurred, the police assume that he's mentally unstable and ignore his claims. Police detective Wong Wai-han is investigating a series of gruesome murders, but soon discovers that all is not as it seems and that not only are the murders connected, but that Jun is tied to them in some way.

Cast
Sean Lau as Wong Wai-han
Wang Baoqiang as Wu Zaijun
Elanne Kong as Wong Yue-yee
Joey Meng as Wai
Ken Lo as Old Guy
Lam Suet as Cheung Fai
Felix Lok as Commander Chan
Elena Kong as Chiu Lan
James Ho as Simon
Gary Chiu as Sai
Anson Leung as pathologist
Kelly Fu as Cindy
Ciwi Lam
Rex Ho
Lam Ying-yuen
Carolyn Chan
Yip Wan-keung
Kunpimook Bhuwakul as Wong Wai-han's son

Reception
The movie review site Twitch panned the film, expressing disappointment in the acting range of Wang Baoqiang in the film. The Xinhua News Agency praised the film's acting, but criticized the film's ending as too bizarre and not always coherent.

References

External links

2012 horror films
Hong Kong horror films
Police detective films
2010s Cantonese-language films
Hong Kong serial killer films
Films directed by Danny Pang
Films set in Hong Kong
Films shot in Hong Kong
Le Vision Pictures films
2010s Hong Kong films